Zashchitnaya Bay is the northernmost part of  Vyborg Bay. It is located adjacent to the city of Vyborg, Leningrad Oblast, Russia. Vyborg Bay is part of the Gulf of Finland in the Baltic Sea. The Castle of Vyborg and the Monrepos Park face Zashchitnaya Bay. The old Saimaa Canal (opened in 1856), as well as the new one, connect Zashchitnaya Bay with Lake Saimaa in Finland.

In the Middle Ages, the river Vuoksa had an outlet in Suomenvedenpohja, which however dried up little by little due to post-glacial rebound and was left completely dry in 1857 when the  Kiviniemi rapids in Losevo were formed and the Burnaya River became the main outlet of Vuoksa.

The Russian name of the bay is derived from the Russian word for defense and may be translated as "shielding".

Sources 
 Map
 a society conserving the park of Monrepos
  a map of Monrepos
 a Historical Study of the villages surrounding Suomenvedenpohja - bay 
 a State treaty between Finland and the Soviet union about the Saimaa Canal mentioning location of the Canal in Suomenvedenpohja.
 a link to a picture From Suomenvedenpohja

Karelian Isthmus
Vyborg
Bays of Leningrad Oblast